Antoine Jourde (23 September 1848 – 30 January 1923) was a French politician.
He was born into a peasant family and worked in an umbrella factory, a flower shop and for a wine dealer among other jobs.
He was elected as a Boulangist and socialist, and was the author or co-author of over 20 proposed laws.
During the Dreyfus affair he was against Dreyfus at first, but changed his mind when evidence of forgery of evidence against Dreyfus emerged.
He was active in the French Freemasonry movement.

Early years

Antoine Jourde was born on 23 September 1848 in Saint-Merd-de-Lapleau, Corrèze.
His family were Corrèze peasants.
Jourde went to primary school, then began work at the age of 14 in an umbrella factory in Angers.
During the Franco-Prussian War of 1870–71 he served as a sergeant in the army of General Joseph Vinoy.
A bullet wounded him in the chest on 19 September 1870 at Villejuif and he was taken prisoner by the Germans.
He escaped on 19 January 1871 and rejoined his regiment.
He was decorated with the military medal, and from 1871 to 1874 was adjutant at the Prytanée National Militaire, a secondary school in La Flèche for students interested in a military career.

Jourde was initiated as a Freemason in 1876.
In 1877 he married Berthe Michaud and helped with her flower shop on the Rue Porte Dijeau in Bordeaux.
He was then hired as a trade representative for the Buisson fils wine dealer.
He was director of the Girondin Warehouses Exchange and editor of the Voix du Peuple.
In 1885 he founded a Freemasons lodge named "Le grand progrès social".
He separated from his wife, but supported his two daughters and son properly, and helped his son become director of litigation in Nogent-sur-Marne.

Political career

Jourde was a far-left activist, but had no personal fortune to start a political career.
The opportunity came with the September–October 1889 legislative elections, when the conservative monarchists helped election of radical Boulangists.
In the 1889 elections he was one of three Boulangists affiliated with the French Workers' Party (POF: Parti ouvrier français), the others being Christophe Thivrier of Allier and Ernest Ferroul of Narbonne.
He remained active in the POF until the late 1890s.
Jourde was elected to the Chamber of Deputies for 3rd constituency of Bordeaux, Gironde. on 6 October 1889.
He ran as a republican socialist Boulangist candidate, and defeated the incumbent Fernand Faure in the second round of voting.
He was opposed to the parliamentary regime and in favor of a constituent assembly to revise the constitution.
During the 1892 municipal elections Jourde and François Aimelafille tried to organize the socialists to defend the interests of the workers against the republicans, but failed.

In the 1893 elections Jourde ran as an independent socialist, and was elected with difficulty.
He was reelected in the second round on 3 September 1893, again running against Fernand Faure.
In his second term Jourde was again in favor of a referendum, a single chamber, progressive tax on income over 3,000 francs, a pension fund for workers, repeal of the law against the Socialist International and other measures.
He succeeded in a law to make the minutes of the Chamber available for sale to the public.
He proposed to tax the operations of the bourse.
He declared himself in favour of giving all people the right to live through work.
He was in favour of unifying all retirement pensions, and took part in all discussions concerning labour laws.
Jourde was the most nationalist of the Guesdists, and at one point proposed that foreign workers should be banned from France, an idea that was alien to Guesde and to the POF.
He said, "the day when employers are obliged to pay foreign workers the same salary as they pay our nationals ... our people will prefer to hire Frenchmen rather than foreigners."
He was very active in debates, and sat in many committees including those on the army and social welfare and insurance.
He was secretary of the Chamber from 1897 to 1899.

In 1898 Jourde's campaign was funded by the Federal Socialist Committee of Bordeaux.
He was reelected in the first round on 8 May 1898.
He was strongly criticized by the Nouvelliste and by the Bordeaux edition of l'Intransigeant of Paris for his lack of firm conviction and his attempts to bribe the mayor Camille Cousteau(fr).
On 7 July 1898 he voted with the house to post the speech of General Cavaignac on the Dreyfus affair.
On 5 June 1899 Jourde stated that he felt deep regret for this, and to repair what he called his "error and foolishness" he voted to halt the judgement of the Court of Cassation referring Dreyfus to the Rennes War Council.
By the 1902 elections Jourde had lost his former popularity with the workers, while his opponent Albert Dormoy(fr) had won a reputation as a paternalistic philanthropist while an engineer for the Chemins de fer du Midi railway company.
On 11 May 1902 Jourde was defeated in the second round by Dormoy.
On 20 May 1906 he defeated Dormoy in the second round to regain his seat.
He was made a Chevelier of the Legion of Honour in 1913.
On 26 April 1914 he was decisively defeated and abandoned politics.

Jourde was a member of the council of the Grand Orient de France from 1903 to 1906, member of the Grand College of Rites from 1913 to 1919, member of the "La Française" lodge and the "Neuf Soeurs Réunis Orient de Bordeaux".
Antoine Jourde  died on 30 January 1923 in Caudéran, now part of Bordeaux, Gironde.
He had no religious views and was buried in a civil ceremony.

Publications

Antoine Jourde was author or co-author of various proposed laws (PDL):

Notes

Sources

 

1848 births
1923 deaths
People from Corrèze
Politicians from Nouvelle-Aquitaine
Members of the 5th Chamber of Deputies of the French Third Republic
Members of the 6th Chamber of Deputies of the French Third Republic
Members of the 7th Chamber of Deputies of the French Third Republic
Members of the 9th Chamber of Deputies of the French Third Republic
French Freemasons
Chevaliers of the Légion d'honneur